Piyal Nishantha de Silva (born 30 June 1970) is a Sri Lankan politician and MP representing the Sri Lanka Podujana Peramuna. He is the current State Minister of Fisheries

Career 
He contested at the 2015 parliamentary election representing the United People's Freedom Alliance from the Kalutara District and was elected to the 15th Parliament.

He also contested at the 2020 parliamentary election representing the Sri Lanka Podujana Peramuna and was elected to the 16th Parliament. On 12 August 2020, he was appointed as the State Minister of Women and Children's Development, Pre-School and Primary Education, and School Infrastructure and Education Services as a part of the second cabinet of the President Gotabaya Rajapaksa despite concerns were raised regarding the appointment of a male minister to handle and look after women affairs.

In January 2021, he was tested positive for COVID-19 after drinking concoction, a medicine which was claimed by the media as a herbal medicine given by Hindu goddess Kali.

References 

1970 births
Living people
Sinhalese politicians
United People's Freedom Alliance politicians
Sri Lanka People's Freedom Alliance politicians
Sri Lanka Podujana Peramuna politicians
Members of the 15th Parliament of Sri Lanka
Members of the 16th Parliament of Sri Lanka